Queen Elizabeth's School (QEGS) is a non-selective academy school for 11- to 18-year-olds in the town of Ashbourne, Derbyshire, England. In the academic year 2009–10, there were 1,396 pupils on roll.

Both the main school and 6th form have in the past appeared within the top 25 in league tables, and in October 2008, Ofsted marked the school as "good" or "outstanding" in all sections.  However in 2013 Ofsted marked the school as 'requires improvement' in 3 of the 4 categories. In 2009 the school celebrated 100 years at the Green Road site.

History
The group who founded the school in 1585, included Sir Thomas Cokayne (or Cockayne), High Sheriff of Derbyshire and Thomas Carter of the Middle Temple, London.  Sir Thomas Cokayne granted £4 a year out of his lands towards the maintenance of the school. He is often credited as the founder of the school; this is due to his Lordship of the Town of Ashbourne and the fact the school took his family's coat of arms. The original building still exists today.

The school moved to its current site on the Green Road in 1909.

Prior to 1973 the school was a grammar school, with an "11 plus" entry exam. In 1973 QEGS merged with the Ashbourne County Secondary School on Old Derby Road. The school kept both sites, and continued to use the historical name "Queen Elizabeth's Grammar School" although it operated as a comprehensive secondary school, not a grammar school, and had no entry exam and was the sole state secondary school in the town.

QEGS was awarded technology specialist status in 2005, and a new technology block was built with the funding received. On 1 August 2011 it converted to Academy Status and became an Independent State School but still serves the same catchment area and has the same admissions procedures.

Current buildings

'Old building': is the oldest part of the school, and is used for teaching maths and ICT. It also holds some smaller classrooms for SEN teaching.
'Science corridor': runs adjacent to the old building. Chemistry and physics are taught here. It is connected to the main building by a corridor with the library off it. The drama studio and gym are also connected to the science corridor.
'West wing': holds the main SEN classroom and a sixth form chemistry lab.
'East wing': contains a computer room and several offices.
'Teaching block' or 'New building': the largest building of the school. Subjects taught here include modern foreign languages, geography, history, biology, chemistry, physics, English, religious studies and art.
'Halls block': contains the canteen, main hall, sports hall and the music department.
'Old technology block': several technology workshops as well as food technology areas.
'New technology block': built in 2005, this contains up-to-date technology classrooms and workshop.

Sixth form centre
There are two buildings at the sixth form centre, where sixth form studies are taught, such as psychology, sociology and economics. An extension to the sixth form centre has now been added which is now open to staff and pupils, including a new information technology suite.

Notable former pupils
 Gordon Bourne (1921–29) Obstetrician and author
 William Charles Langdon Brown CBE (1931–), Banker 
 Captain Sir Robert Beaufin Irving OBE (1877–1954)
 Charlotte Methuen FRHistS (1964-), Church historian and Anglican priest
 Raymond Spencer Millard, (1920–97), Civil Engineer
 William Kenneth Ward, (1918–95), Under-Secretary, Department of Trade
 Neil Cooper, (1973–), drummer for Therapy?, teaches drumming at QEGS.
 Andrew Lewer MBE (1971-) Conservative Party politician

See also
 List of English and Welsh endowed schools (19th century)

References

External links
 Queen Elizabeth's Grammar School
 School profile
 Ofsted reports
 The Times league tables

Educational institutions established in the 1580s
Academies in Derbyshire
1585 establishments in England
Secondary schools in Derbyshire
Ashbourne, Derbyshire